Knezha Island is the northernmost island in the Pitt group of Biscoe Islands, Antarctica.  The feature extends 900 m in north-south direction and 880 m in east-west direction.

The island is named after the town of Knezha in Northern Bulgaria.

Location
British mapping in 1971.

Maps
 British Antarctic Territory: Graham Coast.  Scale 1:200000 topographic map.  DOS 610 Series, Sheet W 65 64.  Directorate of Overseas Surveys, UK, 1971.
 Antarctic Digital Database (ADD). Scale 1:250000 topographic map of Antarctica. Scientific Committee on Antarctic Research (SCAR). Since 1993, regularly upgraded and updated.

References
 Bulgarian Antarctic Gazetteer. Antarctic Place-names Commission. (details in Bulgarian, basic data in English)
 Knezha Island. SCAR Composite Antarctic Gazetteer.

External links
 Knezha Island. Copernix satellite image

Islands of the Biscoe Islands
Bulgaria and the Antarctic